John Anderson McDowell (September 25, 1853 – October 2, 1927) was for two terms a U.S. Representative from Ohio for two terms from 1897 to 1901.

Biography 
Born in Killbuck, Ohio, McDowell attended the common schools, the Millersburg High School, and Lebanon (Ohio) Normal College.
He graduated from the Mount Union College, Alliance, Ohio, in 1887.
He taught in rural schools 1870-1877.  Following this he served as principal of Millersburg High School 1877-1879.
Superintendent of Millersburg schools 1879-1896.
County school examiner for twenty years.
Instructor in the summer school of the College of Wooster, Ohio from 1896 to 1917 and in the summer school of Ashland College, Ohio in 1918.

Congress 
McDowell was elected as a Democrat to the Fifty-fifth and Fifty-sixth Congresses (March 4, 1897 – March 3, 1901).
He was an unsuccessful candidate for renomination in 1900.
Superintendent of public instruction of the Ashland city schools 1908-1927.
Trustee of the State normal college at Kent, Ohio from 1911 to 1922.

Later career and death 
He served as president of Northeastern Ohio Teachers' Association in 1921 and of Ohio State Teachers' Association in 1926.
He was also interested in agricultural pursuits.
He died in Cleveland, Ohio, October 2, 1927.
He was interred in Oak Hill Cemetery, Millersburg, Ohio.

Sources

1853 births
1927 deaths
People from Holmes County, Ohio
National Normal University alumni
College of Wooster faculty
University of Mount Union alumni
Kent State University people
Democratic Party members of the United States House of Representatives from Ohio